Chah Kutah (also Romanized as Chāh Kūtāh) is a village in Howmeh Rural District, in the Central District of Bushehr County, Bushehr Province, Iran. At the 2006 census, its population was 1,848, in 455 families.

References 

Populated places in Bushehr County